Tempo is a 1930 sans-serif typeface designed by R. Hunter Middleton for the Ludlow Typograph company. Tempo is a geometric sans-serif design, closely copying German typefaces in this style, above all Futura, which had attracted considerable attention in the United States. Unlike Futura, however, it has a "dynamic" true italic, with foot serifs suggesting handwriting and optional swash capitals.

Tempo was expanded to a sprawling family released over the 1930s and 40s, that has not been fully digitised. It included the shadow-form display typeface Umbra, which has often been released separately. Some styles had a double-storey 'a' in the usual print form, similar to Erbar, others the single-storey form in the manner of Futura, and numerous alternative characters were available. Digital-period type designer James Puckett describes it as "bonkers; really four typefaces that just got lumped together for the sake of marketing." Middleton also designed a slab-serif typeface in similar style, Karnak, around the same time, again copying a German trend of Futura-style "geometric" slab-serifs.

Tempo's italic, with its 'feet' at the bottom of the letters, was an influence on that of the popular 2002 geometric sans-serif family Neutraface, designed by Christian Schwartz.

References

External links
 Fonts in Use
 Ludlow specimen book
 Gallery by Stephen Coles

Letterpress typefaces
Geometric sans-serif typefaces
Typefaces designed by R. Hunter Middleton